Alexander Placide (1750–1812), was an American (originally French) actor and theatre manager. He debuted in France in 1770 and was active in Saint-Domingue until the Haitian Revolution, when he emigrated to the United States. He managed the Charleston Theatre from 1796 and was the leader of the Charleston Company, which also toured Georgia and Virginia and are considered to have introduced a permanent theatre in these states. In 1812 he became a co-manager with William Twaits and Jean Baptiste Casmiere Breschard of the Olympic Theatre in New York.

He was married to Charlotte Wrighten Placide and father of Jane Placide.

References

1812 deaths
18th-century American male actors
American male stage actors
1750 births
18th-century French male actors
People of Saint-Domingue
18th-century theatre managers
19th-century theatre managers
18th-century circus performers